Kassa may refer to:

Places
 Kassa (Bithynia), a place in ancient Bithynia, Anatolia
 Kassa, Mali, a commune
 Kassa Dam, in Japan
 Kassa Island, in the group of Îles de Los near Guinea
 Košice, a city in Slovakia

People
 Kassa (name), a given and surname
 Kassa (mansa), a ruler of the Mali Empire in 1360
 Kassa of Kwara or Tewodros II (c. 1818–1868), Emperor of Ethiopia

Other uses
 Kassa (TV program), a Dutch consumer protection TV program
 Keeping All Students Safe Act (KASSA), legislative proposals introduced in 2011 in the United States Congress
 Bombing of Kassa, in 1941 Kassa Hungary

See also
 
 Ylinen Kassa, a village in Sweden
 Kasa (disambiguation)
 Casa (disambiguation)